The original Vancouver Whitecaps were a professional soccer team founded on December 11, 1973. During the 1970s and 1980s they played in the North American Soccer League (NASL).

The Whitecaps of that era included international players such as Alan Ball, Ruud Krol and Bruce Grobbelaar, but also British Columbian stars like Bobby and Sam Lenarduzzi, Buzz Parsons, and Bruce Wilson.

In 1979, the team from the "Village of Vancouver" (a reference to ABC TV sportscaster Jim McKay's observation that "Vancouver must be like the deserted village right now", with so many people watching the game on TV) beat the powerhouse New York Cosmos in one of the most thrilling playoff series in NASL history to advance to the 1979 Soccer Bowl. Saturday, September 8, 1979, they triumphed against the Tampa Bay Rowdies at the Giants Stadium before a crowd of 50,699 (66,843 tickets had been sold for the game).

It was during this short period that soccer interest peaked in Vancouver. The Whitecaps attendance at Empire Stadium grew to an average of 28,000 per game with playoff matches reaching the 32,000 capacity. The team also recorded two tracks, with "White Is the Colour" (a takeoff on Chelsea's "Blue Is the Colour") becoming a hit on local radio during the run-up to their championship win.

After playing at Vancouver's 32,000-seat Empire Stadium for most of their existence, the team moved into the new 60,000-seat BC Place Stadium in 1983.

The team played indoor soccer on and off during their existence. The Pacific Coliseum served as the home field for their 1980–81 and 1983–84 NASL indoor seasons. However, for the 1981–82 indoor season the Whitecaps used the much smaller PNE Agrodome, as the Pacific Coliseum became unavailable.

With the demise of the NASL in 1984 the Whitecaps, along with many other teams in the NASL, were forced to fold.

History

Vancouver was announced as an expansion franchise in the North American Soccer League on December 11, 1973, set to enter the league in 1974 alongside Seattle, Los Angeles, and San Jose. The seven-person ownership group was led by Herb Capozzi and included several businesspeople from the Lower Mainland. The city had previously hosted the Vancouver Royal Canadians, a United Soccer Association team that played for the 1967 season with players from Sunderland A.F.C and in 1968 as the Royals before folding. The team announced their name, the Whitecaps, in February 1974 and signed their first player, former West Bromwich Albion striker and Vancouver native Glen Johnson.

Year-by-year

This is a complete list of seasons for the NASL club. For a season-by-season history including the current MLS franchise, see History of Vancouver Whitecaps FC. For solely MLS results, see List of Vancouver Whitecaps FC seasons.

1. Avg. attendance include statistics from league matches only.
2. Top goalscorer(s) includes all goals scored in League, League Playoffs, Canadian Championship, CONCACAF Champions League, FIFA Club World Cup, and other competitive continental matches.

Indoor

Honours

NASL Championship
 1979

Conference titles
 1979 National Conference Champions

Division titles
 1978 Western Division (National Conference)
 1979 Western Division (National Conference)
 1981 Northwest Division
 1980–81 Northwest Division (indoor)
 1983 Western Division

NASL attendance leader
 1983 (29,164 per game)
 1984 (15,208 per game)

NASL coach of the year
 1978 Tony Waiters
 1982 Johnny Giles

North American player of the year
 1978 Bob Lenarduzzi
 1983 Tino Lettieri

NASL playoff MVP
 1979 Alan Ball

NASL leading goalkeeper
 1978 Phil Parkes (GAA: 0.95, Wins: 23, SO: 10)
 1979 Phil Parkes (GAA: 0.96, SO: 7)
 1982 Tino Lettieri (GAA: 1.23)
 1983 Tino Lettieri (GAA: 0.86, GA: 25, SO: 11)

U.S. Soccer Hall of Fame members
  2003: Bob Lenarduzzi, Arnie Mausser, Bruce Wilson

Indoor Soccer Hall of Fame members
 2014 Dale Mitchell

Indoor All-Star game
 1983–84 Reserves: Carl Valentine, Peter Ward, Tino Lettieri

All-Star First Team selections
 1977 Bruce Wilson
 1979 Phil Parkes
 1980 Rudi Krol
 1983 David Watson, Frans Thijssen
 1984 Frans Thijssen, Peter Ward

All-Star Second Team selections
 1977 Buzz Parsons
 1978 John Craven, Kevin Hector
 1979 Alan Ball, Bob Lenarduzzi
 1981 Peter Lorimer, Pierce O'Leary
 1983 Tino Lettieri
 1983–84 Carl Valentine (indoor)
 1984 Bob Lenarduzzi, Fran O'Brien

All-Star honourable mentions
 1976 Tommy Ord
 1982 Carl Valentine, John Wile
 1983 Peter Beardsley, David Cross, Fran O'Brien
 1984 Paul Bradshaw, Carl Valentine

Indoor All-Stars
 1980–81 Carl Valentine, Gerry Gray, Bruce Grobbelaar

Canadian Soccer Hall of Fame members
  2000 Sam Lenarduzzi, Luigi Moro, Bruce Wilson
  2001 Gerry Gray, Bob Lenarduzzi, Tino Lettieri, Tony Waiters
  2002 Dale Mitchell, Mike Sweeney
  2003 Ian Bridge, Buzz Parsons, Carl Valentine
  2004 Bob Bolitho
  2005 Garry Ayre
  2006 Brian Robinson, Randy Samuel
  2007 Herb Capozzi, Glen Johnson
  2008 Bruce Twamley, Les Wilson
  2009 Neil Ellett
  2011 Victor Kodelja,  Soccer Bowl '79 Champions
  2014 Chris Bennett

Statistics

Attendance
The record home attendance for a Whitecaps game was on June 20, 1983. 60,342 came to watch the caps take on the Seattle Sounders in the first game at BC Place Stadium. It was also the largest crowd to ever see a club soccer match in Canada until the Montreal Impact surpassed the mark with 60,860 on May 12, 2012.

Average yearly attendance
1974 10,098
1975 7,579
1976 8,656
1977 11,897
1978 15,724
1979 22,962
1980 26,834
1981 23,236
1982 18,251
1983 29,164
1984 15,208

See also
Vancouver Royals
History of Vancouver Whitecaps FC

References 

 
Defunct soccer clubs in Canada
North American Soccer League (1968–1984) teams
Association football clubs established in 1974
Association football clubs disestablished in 1984
Canadian indoor soccer teams
North American Soccer League (1968–1984) teams based in Canada
1973 establishments in British Columbia
1984 disestablishments in British Columbia